Platonești is a commune located in Ialomița County, Muntenia, Romania. It is composed of two villages, Lăcusteni and Platonești. These were part of Săveni Commune until 2005, when they were split off.

References

Communes in Ialomița County
Localities in Muntenia